General Miller may refer to:

United Kingdom
Alfred Douglas Miller (1864−1933), British Army brigadier general
Euan Miller (1897–1985), British Army lieutenant general

United States

U.S. Army
Austin S. Miller (born 1961), general
Charles R. Miller (general) (fl. 1990s–2020s), major general
Geoffrey D. Miller (born 1949), major general
Harry E. Miller Jr. (born c. 1958), major general
Henry J. F. Miller (1890–1949), Air Forces general
John E. Miller (general) (born 1941), lieutenant general
John Franklin Miller (senator) (1831–1886), Union Army brevet major general
Luther D. Miller (1890–1972), major general
Marcus P. Miller (1835–1906), brigadier general
Thomas G. Miller (fl. 1970s–2010s), lieutenant general

U.S. Air Force
David N. Miller (fl. 1990s–2020s), brigadier general
David V. Miller (1919–2016), major general
George D. Miller (born 1930), lieutenant general
Maryanne Miller (fl. 1980s–2010s), general
Monte B. Miller (1930–2015), lieutenant general
Robert I. Miller (born 1963), lieutenant general
Tom D. Miller (fl. 1990s–2020s), major general

U.S. Marines Corps
Edward J. Miller (USMC) (1922–1993), lieutenant general
Gerald L. Miller (born 1942), brigadier general
John C. Miller Jr. (1912–2000), brigadier general
John H. Miller (born 1925), lieutenant general
Lyle H. Miller (1889–1973), brigadier general
Walter Lee Miller Jr. (fl. 1970s–2010s), major general

Other U.S. services
Charles Miller (businessman) (1843–1927), Pennsylvania Army National Guard major general
James Miller (general) (1776–1851), brigadier general in the War of 1812
Johnny R. Miller (fl. 1980s–2010s), Illinois Army National Guard major general
Nathan Miller (Rhode Island shipbuilder) (1743–1790), Continental Army general in the American Revolution
William Miller (Confederate Army officer) (1820–1909), Confederate States Army brigadier general

Other
Guillermo Miller (1795–1861), Peruvian general
Yevgeny Miller (1867–1939), general in the White Russian army

See also
General Millar (disambiguation)
Attorney General Miller (disambiguation)